Satwant Singh "Sat" Bains (born 28 February 1971) is an English chef best known for being chef proprietor of the two-Michelin star Restaurant Sat Bains with Rooms in Nottingham, England. He won the Roux Scholarship in 1999, and worked in France, before returning to the UK and opening his own restaurant. Bains was also one of the winners on the BBC show Great British Menu in 2007.

Early life
Satwant Bains was born on 28 February 1971 in Derby, England. His parents were  Sikhs who had only recently migrated to the UK. Throughout his childhood, Bains's father owned a number of shops, resulting in Sat's first job as a paperboy. His mother was a housewife, and cooked mostly vegetarian meals, although would occasionally cook keema on a Saturday. Bains would later recall that he wasn't interested in learning how to cook during his childhood.

Career
At the age of 18, he attended the Wilmorton site of Derby College, reportedly only joining the catering course because it had the most girls on it. He passed the course, earning a City & Guilds qualification. He began to work at a restaurant under Mick Murphy, who he later described as an inspiration due to the passion that Murphy had for food.

He discovered the work of Marco Pierre White, and read the White Heat cookbook. He would later explain that he read the entire book in three and a half hours, describing it as "iconic". This inspired Bains to strive for something better and he sent off CVs to better-quality restaurants than the one he was working in. One of the chefs that sent him a rejection letter was John Burton Race. Raymond Blanc hired Bains as one of eighteen staff members for the opening of the first Le Petit Blanc in Oxford in 1996. Bains later recalled that within six months of opening, there were only ten staff members left. He moved on to work at the London-based L'Escargot for 3 months and then returned to Nottingham.

Whilst in Nottingham in 1999, he applied for the Roux Scholarship. Between the regional and national round, the restaurant he was working at closed, leaving him unemployed. In the final round he felt as if he were the underdog, and particularly remembers the chef from Gordon Ramsay's Aubergine competing. Bains won the competition, enabling him to travel to France to work at the three Michelin starred Le Jardin des Sens. He worked alongside another chef in training, René Redzepi. While in the south of France, he also chose to visit El Bulli in Spain.

He became head chef at the Hotel des Clos in Nottingham, which was relaunched as Restaurant Sat Bains with Rooms in November 2002. Bains sent one of his sous chefs to Denmark to help his former colleague Redzepi open his restaurant Noma during the same year. Restaurant Sat Bains was awarded a Michelin star in 2003 becoming the first restaurant in Nottingham to win a star.

The restaurant's Michelin star rating was increased to two stars in 2011, which food critic Jay Rayner said was overdue and the length of time taken to give Bains his second star undermined Michelin's authority. The restaurant has also been awarded five rosettes by the AA.

During the summer of 2012, Bains took a turn in being head chef at a popup restaurant on top of the Southbank Centre in London. "The Cube" also featured other chefs such as Tom Kitchin and Daniel Clifford.

Bains was crowned with the coveted Chef Award at the 2015 The Catey Awards.

Television work
After originally declining the chance, he appeared as one of the competitors on the 2007 Great British Menu where fourteen chefs battled it out to win the chance to cook at a four-course banquet hosted by the British ambassador to France. He won the Midlands and the East heat beating the previous year's winner, Galton Blackiston from Norfolk. In the final round, Bains' starter of egg, ham, and peas was adjudged the best amongst the seven finalists with three perfect 10 scores from the three judges. Bains went on to add the dish to his menu at Restaurant Sat Bains. Bains credited his appearance on the show for an upturn in sales and a solid booking of the restaurant for the following ten months. He has also made appearances on the BBC's Saturday Kitchen and UKTV's Market Kitchen.
Bains appeared in the 2012 PBS series Mind of a Chef with David Chang.  In his segment during the final episode of that series, Bains comments on the appearance of his smoked onion aioli, "you know it's going to be aggressive because it's black."

In 2015, Bains was a guest judge on MasterChef Australia during Season 7, week 2, where Bains asked the contestants to recreate his beef and mushrooms recipe in two and half an hours.

Awards
Restaurant named him the Chef's Chef of the Year in 2009. He was also named the Which? Good Food Guide Chef of the Year in 2011. The University of Derby awarded Bains an honorary degree of Doctor of Professional Practice in April 2011, and this was followed by an honorary Master of Arts degree from the University of Nottingham in 2012.

Personal life
Bains has a collection of between 700 and 800 cookbooks, and published his first in September 2012 entitled "Too Many Chiefs Only One Indian". He has stated that his favourite restaurant is Heston Blumenthal's The Fat Duck, or El Bulli in Spain. He is married to his wife Amanda; they met whilst they were both teenagers.

Controversies
On 7 November 2012, Bains was among a number of chefs who joined in the cyber-bullying of a customer to his associate Claude Bosi's restaurant Hibiscus. James Isherwood had written on his blog 'Dining With James' that he had not enjoyed his starter, leading Bosi and fellow Michelin star chef Tom Kerridge to verbally abuse him on Twitter.

He has also been known to react badly to online criticism, such as TripAdvisor reviews, insulting customers on a personal level when they have been unhappy with his restaurant.

References

External links

Official website of the restaurant

1971 births
Living people
British people of Indian descent
People from Derby
People from Nottingham
English chefs
Head chefs of Michelin starred restaurants
Alumni of the University of Derby